Gerry Ethridge Gomez (10 October 1919 – 6 August 1996) was a cricketer who played 29 Test matches for the West Indies cricket team between 1939 and 1954, scoring 1,243 runs and taking 58 wickets. He captained in one match for the West Indies when England toured in 1947/8.

Gomez was born in Port of Spain, Trinidad.  During his career at the domestic level, he was an all-rounder of good standard, playing 126 matches and scoring runs at a batting average of nearly 45, in addition to taking 200 wickets at an average just above 25 with his medium pace.

He remained involved with cricket, as manager and administrator, and also served as an umpire in the Test match between West Indies and Australia in Georgetown, Guyana, in April 1965, when the appointed umpire, Cecil Kippins, pulled out on the day before the match.  Kippins was ordered to withdraw by the British Guiana umpires' association, as Barbadian umpire Cortez Jordan was appointed as the second umpire, the first time a West Indian umpire had stood in a Test match outside his home territory. This was the first first-class match that Gomez umpired, and his only Test as an umpire.

Gomez also played football for Trinidad, and both his father and his son played first-class cricket.

In June 1988 Gomez was celebrated on the $1.50 Trinidad and Tobago stamp alongside the Barbados Cricket Buckle.

References

External links
 
 Gerry Gomez: West Indies cricket’s Portuguese connection

1919 births
1996 deaths
Trinidad and Tobago cricketers
Trinidad and Tobago footballers
West Indies Test cricketers
Cricketers from Port of Spain
West Indies Test cricket captains
Trinidad and Tobago cricket administrators
Trinidad and Tobago cricket umpires
West Indies cricket team selectors
West Indian Test cricket umpires
Marylebone Cricket Club cricketers
Association footballers not categorized by position
Trinidad and Tobago people of Portuguese descent